Paris syndrome is a sense of extreme disappointment exhibited by some individuals when visiting Paris, who feel that the city was not what they had expected. The condition is commonly viewed as a severe form of culture shock.

The syndrome is characterized by a number of psychiatric symptoms such as acute delusional states, hallucinations, feelings of persecution (perceptions of being a victim of prejudice, aggression, hostility from others), derealization, depersonalization, anxiety, as well as psychosomatic manifestations such as dizziness, tachycardia, sweating most notably, but also others, such as vomiting.

While the syndrome has been particularly noted among Japanese tourists, it has also affected other travellers or temporary residents from East and Southeast Asia, such as those from China, South Korea and Singapore.

History
Hiroaki Ota, a Japanese psychiatrist working at the Sainte-Anne Hospital Center in France, coined the term in the 1980s and published a book of the same name in 1991. Katada Tamami of Nissei Hospital wrote of a Japanese patient with manic-depression who experienced Paris syndrome in 1998.

Later work by Youcef Mahmoudia, a physician with the hospital Hôtel-Dieu de Paris, indicates that Paris syndrome is "psychopathology related to travel, rather than a syndrome of the traveler." He theorized that the excitement resulting from visiting Paris causes the heart to accelerate, causing giddiness and shortness of breath, which results in hallucinations in the manner similar to (although spurring from opposite causes) the Stendhal syndrome described by Italian psychiatrist Graziella Magherini in her book La sindrome di Stendhal.

Although the BBC reported in 2006 that the Japanese embassy in Paris had a "24-hour hotline for those suffering from severe culture shock", the Japanese embassy states no such hotline exists. Also in 2006, Miyuki Kusama, of the Japanese embassy in Paris, told The Guardian "There are around 20 cases a year of the syndrome and it has been happening for several years", and that the embassy had repatriated at least four Japanese citizens that year. However, in 2011, the embassy stated that, despite media reports to the contrary, it did not repatriate Japanese nationals with Paris syndrome.

Susceptibility

Of the estimated 1.1 million annual Japanese tourists in Paris, the number of reported cases is small. A journal also identified two types of the condition: Those who have previous history of psychiatric problems and those without morbid history who exhibit delayed-expression post traumatic stress disorder. In an interview with Slate.fr, Mahmoudia stated that of the fifty pathological travelers hospitalized each year, only three to five are Japanese.

The French newspaper Libération wrote an article on the syndrome in 2004. In the article, Mario Renoux, the president of the Franco-Japanese Medical Association, states that media and touristic advertising are primarily responsible for creating this syndrome. Renoux indicates that while magazines often depict Paris as a place where most people on the street look like models and most women dress in high fashion brands, in reality neither Van Gogh nor models are on the street corners of Paris. In this view, the disorder is caused by positive representations of the city in popular culture, which leads to immense disappointment as the reality of experiencing the city is very different from expectations: tourists are confronted with an overcrowded and littered city (especially if compared to a Japanese metropolis) and a less than welcoming attitude by French hospitality workers like shopkeepers, restaurant and hotel personnel without considering the higher safety risks to which tourists used to safer cities are suddenly exposed.

In 2014, Bloomberg Pursuits reported the syndrome also affected a few of the million annual Chinese tourists in Paris. Jean-Francois Zhou, president of the association of Chinese travel agencies in France (Association Chinoise des Agences de Voyages en France), said "Chinese people romanticize France, they know about French literature and French love stories... But some of them end up in tears, swearing they’ll never come back." The article cited a 2012 survey from the Paris Tourism Office, in which safety and cleanliness received low scores, and also noted that the Paris Police Prefecture website was made available in Chinese, in addition to English and French. However, Michel Lejoyeux, head of psychiatry at Bichat–Claude Bernard Hospital in Paris, noted in an interview that "Traveler's syndrome is an old story", and pointed to Stendhal syndrome which, conversely, is a set of symptoms arising from an overwhelmingly positive touristic experience.

See also
 
 Japanese community of Paris
 Jerusalem syndrome
 Psychosis
 Stendhal syndrome

References

External links
 Paris Syndrome, a 2010 short documentary

Culture-bound syndromes
Delusions
Psychopathological syndromes
Tourism in Paris